Megan Elizabeth McKinnon (born February 5, 1996) is a Canadian actress with more than 50 credits to her name.

McKinnon was born in Lindsay, Ontario, Canada.  She has appeared in over 40 independent films in Vancouver, British Columbia, Canada, such as Samantha's Art, in which she was nominated for a Young Artist Award in 2005, and The Bully Solution, a short created in 48 hours as a part of the Vancouver Bloodshots Film Festival, October 2005. This film won 1st place by judge Robert Rodriguez (director of Spy Kids).

More recently, she played the role of Wendy in the feature film The Last Mimzy, and the role of Young Allie in the feature film Project Grey.  She won the 2007 Young Artist Award for the title role in Little Samantha Tripp.

Filmography

Awards/Nominations

References

External links

1996 births
Actresses from Ontario
Canadian child actresses
Canadian film actresses
Canadian television actresses
Living people
People from Kawartha Lakes